The 1975 Atlantic Coast Conference men's basketball tournament was held in Greensboro, North Carolina, at the Greensboro Coliseum from March 6–8. North Carolina defeated , 70–66 to win the championship. Phil Ford of North Carolina was named the tournament MVP.

Bracket

References

Tournament
ACC men's basketball tournament
College sports tournaments in North Carolina
Basketball competitions in Greensboro, North Carolina
ACC men's basketball tournament
ACC men's basketball tournament